The New Territories Association of Societies (NTAS) is a pro-Beijing umbrella political group which consists of hundreds of the New Territories community organisations. The founding president of the Association was Lee Lin-sang, who served as the delegate to the National People's Congress in the 1980s and member of the HKSAR Preparatory Committee before the handover of Hong Kong. The Association plays important coordination roles in the election campaigns for the pro-Beijing camp by mobilising members of its affiliated groups to vote for the pro-Beijing candidates. The Association currently holds two seats in the Legislative Council (LegCo), Leung Che-cheung and Chan Han-pan who are both affiliated with the largest pro-Beijing party Democratic Alliance for the Betterment and Progress of Hong Kong (while Leung does not put NTAS as his political affiliation on his biography). Leung also serves as the current president of the Association.

The current chairman is Chan Yung, a Hong Kong deputy to the National People's Congress.

Election performances

Legislative Council elections

District Councils elections

See also
 United Front Work Department
 United Front (China)
 Politics of Hong Kong
 List of political parties in Hong Kong

References

Chinese nationalism
Political parties in Hong Kong
Political parties established in 1985
1985 establishments in Hong Kong